KLNC (105.3 FM, "The Bone") is a radio station broadcasting a classic rock format. Licensed to Lincoln, Nebraska, United States, the station serves the Lincoln area. Studios are located at Broadcast House at 44th Street and East O Street in Lincoln, while its transmitter is located at the master antenna farm at South 84th Street and Yankee Hill Road in the southeast part of the city.

The station is currently owned by NRG Media, which purchased the station from Triad Broadcasting in August 2007.

History
On February 3, 1992, KLNC signed on as KFGE, "Froggy 105.3". Froggy moved to another new build station, 98.1 FM, on July 15, 1996, and 105.3 became oldies-formatted "Kool 105.3", KKUL. In September 2005, KKUL would change call letters to KLNC and shift to classic hits, first as "Linc FM", and then, in December 2007, as "105.3 WOW-FM".

On March 19, 2020, after a few days of stunting, KLNC flipped to classic rock as "105.3 The Bone".  The format change puts The Bone in direct competition with KTGL.

References

External links

LNC
NRG Media radio stations
Classic rock radio stations in the United States